Leslie Clifford Minto (11 July 1886 – 30 March 1955) was an Australian rules footballer who played with Melbourne and Essendon in the Victorian Football League (VFL).

Notes

External links 

Les Minto's playing statistics from VFA Project
EssendonFC past player profile
Profile on Demonwiki

1886 births
1955 deaths
Australian rules footballers from Melbourne
Melbourne Football Club players
Essendon Football Club players
West Melbourne Football Club players
Northcote Football Club players
People from Northcote, Victoria